Sunset Rubdown is an EP by Sunset Rubdown. It was released in January 2006 on the Global Symphonic label. Following the release of Krug's solo album Snake's Got a Leg, Sunset Rubdown acquired three new band members. Before their first collaborative release, Shut Up I Am Dreaming, Krug released Sunset Rubdown which consisted of his more solo material.

Track listing
 "Three Colours" – 2:39
 "Jason Believe Me, You Can't Trust Your Dreams" – 3:14 (extra vocals by Camilla Wynn Ingr)
 "A Day in the Graveyard" – 2:27
 "A Day in the Graveyard II" – 2:16
 "Three Colours II" – 3:49

All songs written and recorded by Spencer Krug.

Credits
 Mastered by Harris Newman at Greymarket Mastering
 Cover art by Matt Shane

References

External links
"Three Colours" (free live recording from Daytrotter)
"Jason Believe Me, You Can't Trust Your Dreams" (free live recording from Daytrotter)

2006 EPs
Sunset Rubdown albums